Monandromyces is a genus of fungi in the family Laboulbeniaceae. The genus contains 11 species.

References

External links
Monandromyces at Index Fungorum

Laboulbeniomycetes